JSC Zarubezhneft is a Russian state-controlled oil company based in Moscow that specializes in exploration, development and operation of oil and gas fields outside Russian territory.  Sergei Kudryashov is the company's General Director and Yevgeny Murov is chairman of the board.

Overview 
According to the company's website, Zarubezhneft's main activities are: exploration, development and operation of oil and gas fields abroad; design, construction and operation of oil refineries, tank farms and pipeline systems; application of advanced Russian technologies for oil field development; testing and export of modern hi-tech methods for oil recovery enhancement and export-import operations for technological equipment supply.

The company was founded in 1967 by the Soviet government to operate in friendly states.

Zarubezhneft's most notable operations are in Vietnam, where it has several joint ventures with the Vietnamese company PetroVietnam, including the joint venture company Vietsovpetro.

In 2009, Zarubezhneft's General Director Nikolai Brunich was awarded with Vietnam’s Labour Order, first class, in recognition of his contributions to the successful operation of Vietsovpetro and cooperation between Vietnam and Russia.

International operations 
Zarubezhneft carries out its activities in: 
 Vietnam 
 Cuba 
 Bosnia and Herzegovina
 Russia (Nenets Autonomous Okrug) 
 Uzbekistan
 Egypt

Saddam's oil vouchers 

Zarubezhneft received 174.5 million barrels worth oil vouchers from the abused Oil-for-Food Programme, according to the paper "The Beneficiaries of Saddam's Oil Vouchers: The List of 270".

References

External links 

Company website (English)
Company website (Russian)
Vietsovpetro's website (English)

Oil companies of Russia
Oil companies of the Soviet Union
Government-owned companies of Russia
Companies based in Moscow
Non-renewable resource companies established in 1967
1967 establishments in Russia